is the first single released by Japanese pop group, Def.Diva. It was released on October 19, 2005. This single hit the #1 of Oricon charts, and around 46,822 copies.

Track listing
Suki Sugite Baka Mitai 4:56
Suki Sugite Baka Mitai (Crazy J-G Jazz Remix) 4:49
Suki Sugite Baka Mitai (Joou Remix) 4:08
Suki Sugite Baka Mitai (Instrumental) 4:55

Personnel
Lyricist: Tsunku
Arranger: Shoichiro Hirata
Remixers: Nao Tanaka, Akira
Catalog No.: EPCE-5381

References

2005 singles
Oricon Weekly number-one singles
Japanese-language songs
Song recordings produced by Tsunku
Song articles with missing songwriters